Rafael de Jesús Ramírez Miranda (born 4 November 1992) is a Mexican professional footballer who plays as a goalkeeper for Liga MX club Necaxa.

Honours
Pachuca
CONCACAF Champions League: 2016–17

External links

1992 births
Living people
Mexican footballers
Association football goalkeepers
Tecos F.C. footballers
Mineros de Zacatecas players
Venados F.C. players
Ascenso MX players
Liga Premier de México players
Tercera División de México players
Footballers from Guadalajara, Jalisco